James Andrew Hiller (born May 13, 1969) is a Canadian former professional ice hockey player. He currently serves as an assistant coach for the Los Angeles Kings of the National Hockey League (NHL). Hiller played 63 games in the NHL with the Los Angeles Kings, Detroit Red Wings and New York Rangers, while spending time in the American Hockey League (AHL) and International Hockey League (IHL). He finished his career playing overseas in the Deutsche Eishockey Liga in Germany and Italian Serie A. Upon retiring, Hiller began a coaching career in the junior leagues.

Playing career
Hiller was born in Port Alberni, British Columbia. After playing Junior A hockey for the Melville Millionaires, major junior in the WHL  with the Prince Albert Raiders, Hiller was drafted in the tenth round, 207th overall, by the Los Angeles Kings in the 1989 NHL Entry Draft. Upon being drafted, Hiller began a three-year college hockey career with Northern Michigan University. NMU won the 1991 NCAA title in Hiller's sophomore year. Following an 86-point campaign with Northern Michigan in a 41-game 1991–92 season, his third with the university, he turned pro with the Los Angeles Kings.

During his rookie season, he was traded to the Detroit Red Wings and completed his rookie season in 1992–93 with 20 points in 61 games split between the two teams. The next season, in 1993–94, Hiller became a New York Ranger, but played only two games with the NHL club, spending his tenure with the organization in the minor leagues with Binghamton Rangers of the AHL and Atlanta Knights of the IHL.

After one season with the Canadian National Team, Hiller went overseas to play in the Deutsche Eishockey Liga with the Starbulls Rosenheim in 1996–97. He finished second in league scoring in his third and final campaign with the club in 1998–99 with 67 points in 52 games, two points behind Martin Jiranek of the Nürnberg Ice Tigers. In 1999–00, Hiller began a two-season stint with the Berlin Capitals, after which he spent one final season with HC Milano of the Italian Serie A before retiring.

Coaching career
After retiring in 2002 from his playing career, Hiller immediately began his coaching career as an assistant coach with the Tri-City Americans of the WHL for two seasons. In 2005–06, he was named head coach of the Alberni Valley Bulldogs of the British Columbia Hockey League (BCHL), where he posted a winning record of 43-12-2. The next season, he was selected to coach the expansion Chilliwack Bruins back in the WHL. He coached the franchise to playoff berths in their first two seasons, but after missing the post-season in his third year with the club, he was fired.

Later in the 2009 off-season, he was named head coach of the Tri-City Americans. In 2010 the Americans reached the WHL Championship Series but lost to the Calgary Hitmen. Hiller received WHL and CHL coach of the year honors for the 2011–12 season.

On July 30, 2014, it was announced Hiller was hired as an assistant coach for the Detroit Red Wings.  Part of his duties are to oversee the Red Wings' power play, which ranked 17th in the league the season before his hire.

After spending one season in Detroit, Hiller followed Mike Babcock to the Toronto Maple Leafs. In Toronto, Hiller was an assistant coach with responsibility of the power play.

On June 19, 2019, the New York Islanders announced that Hiller would be joining their coaching staff as an assistant under Barry Trotz. One month after the Islanders fired Trotz and replaced him with Lane Lambert, Hiller was also relieved of his duties on June 9, 2022.

Career statistics

Awards and honours

References

External links
 

1969 births
Atlanta Knights players
Berlin Capitals players
Binghamton Rangers players
Canadian ice hockey right wingers
Chilliwack Bruins coaches
Detroit Red Wings coaches
Detroit Red Wings players
HC Milano players
Ice hockey coaches
Ice hockey people from British Columbia
Living people
Los Angeles Kings draft picks
Los Angeles Kings players
Melville Millionaires players
New York Islanders coaches
New York Rangers players
Northern Michigan Wildcats men's ice hockey players
People from Port Alberni
Phoenix Roadrunners (IHL) players
Prince Albert Raiders players
Starbulls Rosenheim players
Toronto Maple Leafs coaches
Tri-City Americans coaches
Canadian expatriate ice hockey players in Germany
Canadian expatriate ice hockey players in Italy
Canadian expatriate ice hockey players in the United States
Canadian ice hockey coaches
NCAA men's ice hockey national champions
AHCA Division I men's ice hockey All-Americans